Chinawut-Stéphane Indracusin, also known as Chin, is a Thai singer, actor, model, dancer and music composer. He was the presenter for Sony Skinny T Digital Camera in Malaysia and a singer of growing reputation in Malaysia as well. Indracusin also starred in a Taiwanese drama Love 18 as Joshua. During 2016-2018, Indracusin served the Royal Thai Army as an Armed Force member and the artist of Royal Thai Army.

Early life and education 
Indracusin was born on August 13, 1989 in Bangkok to a Thai Chinese father and a French mother. He has one younger sister, Sophie Marguerite, who is an actress and dancer. His talents are beat box, dance and music composer. He went to  Bangkok Christian College and received a bachelor’s degree of Communication Arts in Broadcasting and Streaming Media Production from Sripatum University.

Career 
Indracusin started his career early on by signing up with the biggest record label in Thailand, GMM Grammy which selected him for the G-JUNIOR young artist development program. In 2003, Indracusin and two other musicians in G-JUNIOR, Rittidet Rittichu and Guy Ellis came together to form a group named Big 3. The music they released at the time was labelled as hip hop but has since been re-categorized into pop and R&B. After the release of their album "We are Big 3", the boys decided to move on with their own careers. Indracusin and Ellis released a second album in 2006 with G-JUNIOR and 10th Club.

In 2007, Indracusin was finally given the opportunity to release his own album, "Chin Up" in May 2007. His first solo single that was unleashed, "Pak Mai Trong Gub Jai" became extremely successful right away, staying on top of the Thai charts for many weeks in a row. As a result, Indracusin is today one of the top teen artists in Thailand. He went to New York City to work on his album 'Maybe I'm Bad'. In the fall of 2008, Indracusin did a Malaysian commercial presenting a Sony Skinny T. For this commercial he recorded several of his songs in Chinese, including 'Term Mai Koi Tem', 'Roo Chai Mai Wa Ruk' and more recently 'Koon Tee Neung'.

In December 2008, he released his second single album "Maybe I'm Bad" featuring his top 10 songs, "One Night Stand" or "Keun Tee Neung". Other well known songs from this new album include "Too Fast Too Serious" and "Hua jai mai chai gra-dard". So far, he has 3 music videos from this album, one for "Keun Tee Neung" featuring himself, "Too Fast Too Serious" featuring himself and Thai upcoming singer in the same label DUCKBAR, Natasha Josephine Blake, and finally one for "Hua hai mai chai gra-dart" featuring himself, his younger sister Sophie and a Singaporean-Swedish model Ase Wang.

Indracusin has also starred in the original Taiwanese drama Love – 18 as Joshua and in year 2016, he released his new single Jub – Yo x Gavin Duval.

TV dramas  
 All of these soap operas presented on Bang Channel

 All of these soap operas presented on Channel 7

 All of these soap operas presented on Channel One

 All of these soap operas presented on Channel 3

 All of these soap operas presented on Channel True4U

 All of these soap operas presented on Line TV

 All of these soap operas presented on Channel PPTV

Films

TV series

Songs as a group member 
Indracusin appeared as a group member of these groups as following:
 We Are Big 3 (As Big 3), 2003 (2546)
 Ten Club (As G – Jr), 2006 (2549)

Music albums and singles 
 Album CHIN UP, 2007 (2550)
 Single Mai Mee Krai Bog Rak, 2008 (2551)
 Album Maybe I'm Bad, 2008 (2551)
 Single Kon Ru Jai (Ost. Series Love-18 Rak Woon Wai Hua Jai 18), 2009 (2552)
 Single Kon Tam Ma Da (Ost. Drama Sood Sa Nae Ha), 2009 (2552)
 Single My Love My Code (Ost. Commercial Ad: CAT 009), 2009 (2552)
 Single Kuen Nee Yak Dai Gee Krang, 2010 (2553)
 Single lan La Feat. Bank Opal, 2010 (2553)
 Single Hai Rak Dern Tang Ma Jer Gun(Ost. Drama 4 Hua Jai Hang Kun Kao: Pa Ta Pee Leh Rak), 2010 (2553)
 Single Nai Wa Ja mai Look Gun Feat. Ter Chantavit Dhanasevi (Ost, Drama Muad Opas), 2011 (2554)
 Single My Bad Habit (Ost. Commercial Ad:Shampoo Pantene), 2012 (2555)
 Single Ter Ja You Nai Jai Kong Chan Sa Mer Feat.Cheranut Yusanonda(Ost. Movie Tong Sook 13), 2013 (2556)
 Single Ya Bok Chan Wa Hai Pai (Ost. Drama Su Pap Bu Rood Ju Tha Thep Series: Koon Chai Roon Na Pee), 2013 (2556)
 Single Nee Kor Rak  (feat. Varitthisa Limthammahisorn) (Ost. Drama Nee Kor La Sa Kor Rak), 2014 (2557)
 "Single Jab – Yo Chin Chinawut x Gavin Duval", 2017 (2560)
 Single Tian Mai Sin Sang (Ost. Drama Sang Jak Poh Series: Tien Mai Sin Sang, 2017 (2560)
 Single Hua Jai Diew Kan (feat. Nantida Kaewbuasai) (Ost. Drama Hua Jai Diew Kan), 2018 (2561)
 Single Bpert Jai (Ost. Drama Lab Luang Jai), 2019 (2562)
 Single Kum Nai Jai (Ost. Drama In Time With You), 2021 (2564)

Songs featuring Chin Chinawut 
 Song: First Love First Hurt – B-O-Y Feat.Chin Chinawut, 2008 (2551)
 Song: Took krung tee Kid Tueng Ter – Auttapon Prakopkong Feat.Chin Chinawut, 2010 (2553)
 Song: Whatever Whenever – Kitti Chiawongsakul Feat.Chin Chinawut, 2011 (2554)
 Song: Sorry – Southside Feat.Chin Chinawut, 2011 (2554)
 Song: Gae Ngao rue Aow Jing – Tatan Feat.Chin Chinawut, 2013 (2556)

Music albums 

 *= Promoted Single

Character voices 
Birdland Dan Ma Had sa Jan As Jemy (First episode date: June 4, 2011 (2552))

International career 
 Chin Up: Malaysia Album, 2010 (2551)
 Yu Jian Ni (Chinese Singles), 2010 (2551)
 Maybe I’m Bad: Malaysia Album, 2011 (2552)
 OST. Love.18 (Chinese Singles), 2011 (2552)

TV shows 
 2017 (2560) – เปลี่ยนหน้าท้าโชว์ Sing Your Face Off (season 3) : Competitor Code: S4

 2017 (2560) – Indracusin also appeared as  The Candle Mask in Thai T.V. Show, The Mask Singer Thailand Season 3 to sing a song Sunday Morning by Maroon 5 in group C. And lost to The Diamond Tiara Mask. He revealed his mask on November 9, 2017.

Awards

References

External links 
 YouTube Channel: Chin Chinawut

1989 births
Chinawut Indracusin
Chinawut Indracusin
Living people
Chinawut Indracusin
Chinawut Indracusin
Chinawut Indracusin